Jan Gustafson is a Swedish sailor in the H-boat class. He became World Champion in 1997 and 2001.

References

Swedish male sailors (sport)
H-boat class sailors
Malmö Segelsällskap sailors
Living people
Year of birth missing (living people)
Place of birth missing (living people)